Prosopocoilus astacoides is a beetle of the Family Lucanidae. It lives 8-10 months and is around 50-70 mm. Like all beetles in the Prosopocoilus genus they have sharp mandibles it uses for fighting. They will shake their antenna when angry.

External links
Photos of Prosopocoilus astacoides blanchardi from Taiwan

Lucaninae
Prosopocoilus
Beetles described in 1840